Concord Academy, formerly named Concord First Assembly Academy (CFA Academy, styled as "cfa Academy") and First Assembly Christian School, is a private college preparatory Christian school in Concord, North Carolina. It was founded in 1976 as a part of the ministry of First Assembly Worship Center (now Multiply Church).  Continuing a close relationship with its home church, First Assembly Christian School became known as CFA Academy in 2013 and then Concord Academy in 2020. It offers pre-school daycare through 12th grade, with about 700 students.

In 2014, 120 churches were represented within the student body. The students come from surrounding cities such as Concord, Kannapolis, and Charlotte, and neighboring counties including Cabarrus, Rowan, Iredell, Mecklenburg, Stanly and Union County.

Curriculum
CFA Academy uses a variety of curricula to comprise its academics, including A Beka, Bob Jones, Saxon, Rosetta Stone, Cengage, Houghton Mifflin, Glencoe, and Prentice Hall. In the high school, a college-preparatory curriculum is taught in the traditional classroom setting under the leadership of certified teachers. High school students are required to take 4 units of English, 4 units of mathematics, 4 units of Bible, 3 units of science, 3 units of social sciences, 1 unit each of health/PE and computer, and 3 units of electives for a total of 23 units for graduation. Advanced Placement and honors classes are also available for students. CFA Academy students regularly score above state and national averages on achievement and college entrance tests.

Class of 2013 graduates were accepted to several prestigious universities, including Duke University, the University of North Carolina at Chapel Hill, Wake Forest University, University of Virginia, and Georgia Tech.

Campus
The school was located at Rockland Circle in the 1970s, though the Worship Center was relocated to its present location in 1978. The Educational Center was not completed until 1988, and the school was relocated to its present location in 1989. The current campus is home to separate elementary and high school buildings, a gymnasium, living center, worship center.
'Up the hill' is where the church, daycare, living center and lower school (K4-8th) is all located. The upper part has 3 floors. The first has a cafeteria, chorus room, reception room, an updated theater room, and a weight lifting room. On the second floor is where the daycare, chapel,
a brand new café, band room, music room, and all of the elementary rooms. On the third floor there are the middle school rooms, science lab, resource center, and art rooms.
The high school is located 'down the hill' on its own campus with two gymnasiums, performance stage, and a computer lab and science lab. The high school is capped around almost 300 students each year; and growing every year.

Fine arts
CFA Academy has middle and high school concert bands, a choral and drama department, and a visual art department. Students have competed in regional and national exhibitions, including the Northeast Medical Student Art Exhibit, Scholastics Art & Writing Awards, ACSI Art Shows, Band Competitions, All-County Band, All-District Band, All-State Band and the Blumey Awards.

Athletics
The sports teams of CFA Academy are called the Eagles. The school offers 12 varsity sports and also has junior varsity and middle school programs. The varsity boys basketball team has been particularly successful over some period of time, winning conference championships and state championships. The boys track team won the 2017 NCISAA 2A State Championship.

The school is a member of the North Carolina Independent Schools Athletic Association and the Metrolina Athletic Conference along with:

Gaston Day School – 2A
Northside Christian Academy – 2A
Gaston Christian School – 3A
Hickory Grove Baptist School – 3A
Metrolina Christian Academy – 3A
Southlake Christian Academy – 3A
Westminster Catawba Christian School – 2A

CFA Academy has produced athletes that have gone on to play at NCAA Division I institutions such as Georgetown, San Francisco, Wake Forest, UAB, Toledo, UNC-Wilmington, Presbyterian, High Point, and UNC-Asheville, as well as various Division II and III and NAIA schools.

Notable alumni
 Codi Miller-McIntyre, professional basketball player for Adriatic League's KK Partizan
 Rachel Reilly, contestant on Big Brother 12 and winner of Big Brother 13
 Ish Smith, NBA player
 Mike Wimmer, child prodigy (graduated cfA and college simultaneously at age 12)

Notes

Christian schools in North Carolina
Schools in Cabarrus County, North Carolina
Private high schools in North Carolina
Private middle schools in North Carolina
Private elementary schools in North Carolina
Preparatory schools in North Carolina